Sir William Bartholomew Hackett (1824 – 17 May 1877) was an Irish judge who was the second Chief Justice of Fiji and the 12th Chief Justice of Ceylon.

He was born in Cork, Ireland, the son of Bartholomew Hackett. He was educated at Stonyhurst College and  Trinity College Dublin, graduating in 1846.

He became a member of the Irish Bar on the Munster circuit, was called to the bar at Lincoln's Inn in 1851 and practiced mainly at the Chancery Bar. In October, 1861 he was appointed Queen's Advocate in Gold Coast acting as Chief Justice until confirmed in the position in April, 1863. The following year he was appointed Lieutenant-Governor of the Gold Coast. In 1866 he moved to south-east Asia to be Recorder of the Prince of Wales's Island (Penang Island). He was knighted on his appointment as Recorder and in 1871 was appointed Acting Chief Justice of the Straits Settlements.

After heading up the courts as Chief Justice of Fiji from 1875 to 1876, he was appointed Chief Justice of Ceylon on 3 February 1877, to fill the vacancy created by the retirement of Edward Shepherd Creasy. He remained Chief Justice for only a few months as he died in 1877 of cholera while in office. He was succeeded by John Budd Phear.

References

1825 births
1877 deaths
People from County Cork
People educated at Stonyhurst College
Alumni of Trinity College Dublin
Chief Justices of British Ceylon
19th-century British judges
19th-century Sri Lankan people
British Ceylon judges
Knights Bachelor
Sri Lankan people of Irish descent
Chief justices of Fiji
Colony of Fiji judges
Straits Settlements judges
Deaths from cholera